François de Roubaix (3 April 1939, Neuilly-sur-Seine, Hauts-de-Seine – 22 November 1975, Tenerife, Canary Islands) was a French film score composer. In a decade, he created a musical style with new sounds, until his death in 1975.

Biography
Roubaix did not receive any formal education in music, but began studying jazz on his own at age 15, forming a band and learning trombone as an autodidact. His father, the Oscar-winning filmmaker , who was a producer of the short film, "An Occurrence at Owl Creek Bridge" and the creator of educational films, offered to let François compose scores for the latter. François' first film score was for a 1961 film by Robert Enrico; through the late 1960s and early 1970s he scored films for Enrico, Jose Giovanni, Jean-Pierre Melville, Jean-Pierre Mocky, and Yves Boisset.

Notable in his style is his use of folk elements, as well as electronic musical instruments such as synthesizers and early drum machines. He is thus seen as a precursor of French electronic music. Roubaix had a home studio where he would overdub parts until he was satisfied with the result. He died in 1975 in a diving accident.   In 1976, his score for Le Vieux Fusil was awarded a César Award.

Scores
 1961 : Thaumeatopoea, la vie des chenilles processionnaires du pin et de leur extermination controlée by Robert Enrico
 1962 : Montagnes magiques by Robert Enrico
 1964 : Contre-point by Robert Enrico
 1964 : Strip-teaseuses ou ces femmes que l'on croit faciles by Jean-Claude Roy
 1965 : Théâtre de la jeunesse : La redevance du fantôme (TV) by Robert Enrico
 1965 : Les Survivants (TV series) by Dominique Genée
 1966 : Les Chats by Philippe Durand
 1966 : Elles by Alain Magrou
 1966 : Les Combinards by Jean-Claude Roy
 1966 : Les Grandes Gueules by Robert Enrico
 1967 : La loi du survivant by José Giovanni
 1967 : Les Poneyttes by Joel Lemoigne
 1967 : Contacts by Dolorès Grassian
 1967 : Des terrils et des Turcs by Jean-Michel Barjol
 1967 : Les aventuriers by Robert Enrico
 1967 : Rue barrée (TV series) by René Versini
 1967 : La vie commence à minuit (TV series) by Yvan Jouannet
 1967 : Les Chevaliers du ciel or Les Aventures de Michel Tanguy - Les aventures de Tanguy et Laverdure (TV series) by François Villiers
 1967 : The Blonde from Peking by Nicolas Gessner
 1967 : Le Samouraï by Jean-Pierre Melville
 1967 : Diaboliquement vôtre by Julien Duvivier
 1968 : Le Paradis terrestre (TV series)
 1968 : Tante Zita by Robert Enrico
 1968 :  by José Giovanni
 1968 : Les Teenagers by Pierre Roustang
 1968 : Les Secrets de la Mer Rouge (TV series) by Pierre Lary
 1968 : Adieu l'ami by Jean Herman
 1968 : Ho! by Robert Enrico
 1968 : La Grande Lessive by Jean-Pierre Mocky
 1968 : Le Témoin by Anne Walter
 1969 : Pépin la bulle (TV series) by Italo Bettiol, Stefano Lonati
 1969 : Les Oiseaux sauvages (TV series)
 1969 : Jeff by Jean Herman
 1969 : 48 heures d'amour by Cécil Saint-Laurent
 1969 : Que ferait donc Faber ? (TV series) by Dolorès Grassian
 1969 :  by Jean-Pierre Desagnat
 1970 : Les Amis by Gérard Blain
 1970 : Une infinie tendresse by Pierre Jallaud
 1970 : L'Étalon by Jean-Pierre Mocky
 1970 : Dernier domicile connu by José Giovanni
 1970 : Pour un sourire by François Dupont-Midy
 1970 : La Peau de Torpedo by Jean Delannoy
 1970 : Teva : Opération Gauguin (TV series) by Adolphe Sylvain
 1970 : L'homme orchestre by Serge Korber
 1970 : Les Novices by Guy Casaril
 1971 : Girl Slaves of Morgana Le Fay by Bruno Gantillon
 1971 : Daughters of Darkness (Les Lèvres rouges) by Harry Kümel
 1971 : Où est donc passé Tom ? by José Giovanni
 1971 : Un peu, beaucoup, passionnément by Robert Enrico
 1971 : Boulevard du Rhum by Robert Enrico
 1972 : La Scoumoune by José Giovanni
 1974 : Chapi Chapo (TV series)
 1975 : Le Vieux Fusil by Robert Enrico

References

[ Roubaix] at Allmusic

 

1939 births
1975 deaths
People from Neuilly-sur-Seine
French film score composers
French male film score composers
Accidental deaths in Spain
Underwater diving deaths
20th-century French composers
20th-century French male musicians